The Tortue River (in French: rivière Tortue) is a tributary of the south shore of the St. Lawrence River where it empties east of the village of L'Islet-sur-Mer.

Toponymy 
The toponym Rivière Tortue was made official on December 5, 1968, at the Commission de toponymie du Québec.

See also 

 List of rivers of Quebec

References 

Rivers of Chaudière-Appalaches
L'Islet Regional County Municipality